Kankavli Assembly constituency is one of the 288 Vidhan Sabha (Legislative Assembly) constituencies of Maharashtra state in Western India. This Assembly constituency is located in the Sindhudurg district.

It is a part of the Ratnagiri-Sindhudurg Lok Sabha constituency, along with five other Vidhan Sabha segments, namely Kudal and Sawantwadi from the Sindhudurg district and Chiplun Sangameshwar, Ratnagiri and Rajapur from the Ratnagiri district.

Members of Legislative Assembly

Election results

General elections 2019

General elections 2014

General elections 2009

See also
 Kankavli
 List of constituencies of Maharashtra Vidhan Sabha

References

Assembly constituencies of Maharashtra
Sindhudurg district